The United States secretary of the interior is the head of the United States Department of the Interior. The secretary and the Department of the Interior are responsible for the management and conservation of most federal land along with natural resources, leading such agencies as the Bureau of Land Management, the United States Geological Survey, Bureau of Indian Affairs and the National Park Service. The secretary also serves on and appoints the private citizens on the National Park Foundation Board. The secretary is a member of the United States Cabinet and reports to the president of the United States. The function of the U.S. Department of the Interior is different from that of the interior minister designated in many other countries.

As the policies and activities of the Department of the Interior and many of its agencies have a substantial impact in the Western United States, the secretary of the interior has typically come from a western state; only one secretary since 1949, Rogers Morton, was not a resident or native of a state lying west of the Mississippi River.

Secretary of the Interior is a Level I position in the Executive Schedule, thus earning a salary of US$221,400, as of January 2021.

Following senate confirmation in March 2021, former U.S. representative Deb Haaland was sworn in as the secretary of the interior, the first Native American to hold the position.

Line of succession
The line of succession for the secretary of interior is as follows:
Deputy Secretary of the Interior
Solicitor of the Interior
Assistant Secretary for Policy, Management and Budget
Assistant Secretary for Land and Minerals Management
Assistant Secretary for Water and Science
Assistant Secretary for Fish, Wildlife and Parks
Assistant Secretary for Indian Affairs
Director, Security, Safety, and Law Enforcement, Bureau of Reclamation
Central Region Director, US Geological Survey
Intermountain Regional Director, National Park Service
Region 6 (Mountain-Prairie Region) Director, US Fish and Wildlife Service
Colorado State Director, Bureau of Land Management
Regional Solicitor, Rocky Mountain Region

List of secretaries of the interior

 Parties
 (3)
 (17)
 (33)
 Status

References

External links

 
 

|-

 
1849 establishments in the United States
Interior
Interior
Secretary of the Interior